Elyria is the debut studio album by rock band Faith and the Muse.

Critical reception
The Washington Post gave the album a mixed review, writing: "A meeting of gothic minds, Faith and The Muse's debut, Elyria, fails to avoid some of the genre's more hackneyed cliches: Gonging church bells and whipping winds conjure a requisitely dank atmosphere, and [Monica] Richards's lyrics reinforce the overwrought ambience." The review ultimately judged the album to be "richly textured" and "an engaging, if melodramatic, effort."

Track listing

Credits
All instruments and voices performed by William Faith and Monica Richards
Mastered by Tom Baker at Future Disc Systems, Hollywood, California
All titles composed by Faith and the Muse c and p Elyrian Music, BMI, 1994, except:
"When to Her Lute Corinna Sings," text by Thomas Campion - Anno Domini 1600
Artwork and layout by Monica Richards
Photography by Clovis IV (photographer)|Clovis IV of Vertigo Graphic Arts, Santa Barbara, California
Original lyrics by Monica Richards, except "The Trauma Coil", written by William Faith.
"The Unquiet Grave", traditional ballad circa 1400

References

Faith and the Muse albums
1994 debut albums